Cawthra is a surname. Notable people with the surname include:

John Cawthra (1789–1851), merchant, distiller and political figure in Upper Canada
Joseph Cawthra (1759–1842), Canadian merchant and politician
Joseph Hermon Cawthra (1886–1957), British sculptor
Mark Cawthra (born 1961), musician and music producer working in the UK
William Cawthra (1801–1880), the eldest son of Joseph Cawthra, patriarch of the Cawthra family in Toronto, Ontario, Canada

See also
Cawthra family of Toronto, famous for its business, social and cultural contributions to the city
Cawthra Park Secondary School, a public high school in Mississauga, Ontario, Canada